Jaroslav Jokeľ (born 2 April 1970) is a Slovak weightlifter. He competed at the 1992 Summer Olympics and the 1996 Summer Olympics.

References

1970 births
Living people
Slovak male weightlifters
Olympic weightlifters of Czechoslovakia
Olympic weightlifters of Slovakia
Weightlifters at the 1992 Summer Olympics
Weightlifters at the 1996 Summer Olympics
Sportspeople from Košice